Marek Antoni Frąckowiak (16 August 1950, Łódź – 6 November 2017, Łódź) was a Polish actor of stage and screen. He had roles in Niespotykanie spokojny człowiek, Ekipa, Ballada o Januszku and The Last Wish. He also extensively dubbed film, television and video games.

Frąckowiak died of spinal cancer on 6 November 2017, at the age of 67.

References

External links

 

1950 births
2017 deaths
Actors from Łódź
Neurological disease deaths in Poland
Deaths from cancer in Poland
Deaths from spinal cancer
Polish male film actors
Polish male stage actors
Polish male television actors
Polish male voice actors